Moulins Communauté is the communauté d'agglomération, an intercommunal structure, centred on the town of Moulins. It is located in the Allier and Nièvre departments, in the Auvergne-Rhône-Alpes and Bourgogne-Franche-Comté regions, central France. Created in 2017, its seat is in Moulins. Its area is 1,336.2 km2. Its population was 64,458 in 2019, of which 19,246 in Moulins proper.

Composition
The communauté d'agglomération consists of the following 44 communes, of which two (Dornes and Saint-Parize-en-Viry) in the Nièvre department:

Aubigny
Aurouër
Avermes
Bagneux
Bessay-sur-Allier
Besson
Bresnay
Bressolles
Chapeau
La Chapelle-aux-Chasses
Château-sur-Allier
Chemilly
Chevagnes
Chézy
Coulandon
Couzon
Dornes
Gannay-sur-Loire
Garnat-sur-Engièvre
Gennetines
Gouise
Limoise
Lurcy-Lévis
Lusigny
Marigny
Montbeugny
Montilly
Moulins
Neuilly-le-Réal
Neure
Neuvy
Paray-le-Frésil
Pouzy-Mésangy
Saint-Ennemond
Saint-Léopardin-d'Augy
Saint-Martin-des-Lais
Saint-Parize-en-Viry
Souvigny
Thiel-sur-Acolin
Toulon-sur-Allier
Trévol
Le Veurdre
Villeneuve-sur-Allier
Yzeure

See also 

 List of intercommunalities of the Allier department

References

Moulins
Moulins
Moulins